On the Spot was the first television series made specifically for TV by the National Film Board of Canada, which aired on CBC Television from 1953 to 1955. Each episode reported on a different aspect of life in Canada. The series was originated by Bernard Devlin.

Series segments were produced with a three-person crew: a director, cameraman and on-screen host, usually Fred Davis. The series debuted on October 6, 1953, at 7:45 pm and ran until June 30, 1954, for a total of 39 episodes. Episodes were initially 15 minutes in length. However, the NFB asked the CBC to increase the time slot to 30 minutes for the second season. The series changed time slots frequently, playing as late as 11:45 pm on Monday nights before going to Sundays at 4:30 pm. The second season aired on Sundays at 10 pm. Cancelled after the 26 episodes of the second season, On the Spot was replaced by Perspective, a 30-minute show that mixed documentary reports and dramatizations on contemporary Canadian issues.

Episodes
Episodes included Survival in the Bush, with producer Robert Anderson, acting as host, apparently dropped off in the Quebec north armed with just an axe; The Dresden Story, looking at racism in a small Ontario town, where the town's white and black populations insisted on being filmed separately; and Artist in Montreal, written and directed by Jean Palardy, looking at the Automatistes movement. Transpacific Flight involved an account of a flight across the Pacific Ocean in 1953, based on first-person interviews of the flight crew by Fred Davis. Another aviation-themed episode was Radar Station (1953). The documentary involved an account of a visit to a radar station while it is involved in a simulated air attack, and is based on first-person interviews by RCAF Squadron Leader Bill Lee, of the staff at the radar station.

One episode that was cancelled was a segment on the workings of the Canadian Parliament, with a mock session with actual members of Parliament. When the film was shown to the Prime Minister's Office, there were complaints about showing a session of Parliament without including the PM and the NFB was forced to shelve the episode.

Sur le vif
Devlin and the NFB also produced a similar French series, Sur le vif. Twenty-six 15-minute episodes of Sur le vif aired on Radio-Canada from October 1954.

References

External links
Complete list of On the Spot episodes
On The Spot - Canadian Communication Foundation

National Film Board of Canada documentary series
CBC Television original programming
1953 Canadian television series debuts
1954 Canadian television series endings
1950s Canadian documentary television series
Black-and-white Canadian television shows